Brenae is the name of a Thracian tribe that was located above the Corpili.

References

See also
Thracian tribes

Ancient tribes in Thrace
Ancient tribes in the Balkans
Thracian tribes